ISO/TC 262 Risk management is a technical committee of the International Organization for Standardization established originally in 2011 as Project Committee and converted in August 2012 into a full Technical Committee (TC) to develop standards in the area of risk management. It has 55 Participating Countries and 18 Observing Countries. 57 national standards organizations have adopted the resulting standard for risk management, ISO 31000.

Published standards

References

External links 
 isotc262.org
 iso.org

ISO standards
ISO technical committees